1085 Amaryllis , provisional designation , is a background asteroid from the outer regions of the asteroid belt, approximately 69 kilometers in diameter. It was discovered on 31 August 1927, by astronomer Karl Reinmuth at the Heidelberg-Königstuhl State Observatory in southwest Germany. The asteroid was named after the flowering planet Amaryllis.

Orbit and classification 

Amaryllis is a non-family asteroid from the main belt's background population. It orbits the Sun in the outer asteroid belt at a distance of 3.1–3.3 AU once every 5 years and 8 months (2,076 days). Its orbit has an eccentricity of 0.04 and an inclination of 7° with respect to the ecliptic.

A few days later, the body's observation arc begins at the United States Naval Observatory  in May 1908, or more than 19 years prior to its official discovery observation at Heidelberg.

Physical characteristics 

Amaryllis has been characterized as an X-type asteroid by Pan-STARRS photometric survey. It is also an assumed carbonaceous C-type asteroid.

Rotation period 

In March 2004, a first rotational lightcurve of Amaryllis was obtained from photometric observations by French amateur astronomer René Roy. Lightcurve analysis gave a rotation period of 18.2 hours with a brightness variation of 0.20 magnitude. In May 2016, the Spanish amateur astronomer group OBAS (Asteroid Observers) measured a refined period of 18.111 hours with an amplitude of 0.19 magnitude.

Diameter and albedo 

According to the surveys carried out by the Infrared Astronomical Satellite IRAS, the Japanese Akari satellite and the NEOWISE mission of NASA's Wide-field Infrared Survey Explorer, Amaryllis measures between 65.55 and 72.93 kilometers in diameter and its surface has an albedo between 0.04 and 0.067.

The Collaborative Asteroid Lightcurve Link derives an albedo of 0.0437 and a diameter of 69.68 kilometers based on an absolute magnitude of 9.8.

Naming 

This minor planet was named after the flowering planet Amaryllis, also known as belladonna lily, Jersey lily, naked lady, or amarillo. The official naming citation was mentioned in The Names of the Minor Planets by Paul Herget in 1955.

Reinmuth's flowers 

Due to his many discoveries, Karl Reinmuth submitted a large list of 66 newly named asteroids in the early 1930s.

References

External links 
 Asteroid Lightcurve Database (LCDB), query form (info )
 Dictionary of Minor Planet Names, Google books
 Asteroids and comets rotation curves, CdR – Observatoire de Genève, Raoul Behrend
 Discovery Circumstances: Numbered Minor Planets (1)-(5000) – Minor Planet Center
 
 

001085
Discoveries by Karl Wilhelm Reinmuth
Named minor planets
19270831